Yeh Tien-lun (born 1975) or Nelson Yeh is a Taiwanese film director.

Early life and career
Yeh Tien-lun is also known by the English name Nelson Yeh. He was born in Twatutia in 1975. His father is Yeh Chin-sheng, and his mother is Tamako Pan. Yeh's sister is Yeh Tan-ching. Yeh Tien-lun studied film while attending Shih Hsin University, but did not begin his filmmaking career upon graduation, as he felt he could not compare to the work of French New Wave film directors Jean-Luc Godard and François Truffaut, or Ingmar Bergman. Additionally, Yeh's television producer father had incurred a large debt to make a film. Due to these influences, the younger Yeh focused instead on other performance art, including dance and choral singing, as well as voice and stage acting. He appeared with Hugh Lee's Ping-Fong Acting Troupe.

Filmmaking career
Yeh leads the  company. Yeh's most successful film is his 2011 directorial debut Night Market Hero, which he developed with the help of his screenwriter sister. That same year, Yeh appeared as an actor in Joe Lee's directorial debut . In Yeh's second feature film,  (2014), the protagonist travels back in time to Twatutia in the 1920s. Yeh produced the 2016 film series {{ill|lt=Metro of Love|Metro of Love|zh|台北愛情捷運系列電影}}, which include the film  directed by Gavin Lin. In 2018, Yeh directed A Taiwanese Tale of Two Cities''.

Yeh has participated in panel discussions at the 2012 and 2015 .

References

External links

1975 births
Living people
Film directors from Taipei
Male actors from Taipei
Taiwanese male film actors
Taiwanese male stage actors
Taiwanese male voice actors
21st-century Taiwanese male actors
Shih Hsin University alumni
Choristers
21st-century Taiwanese male singers
Taiwanese film producers
Taiwanese male dancers